Eduardo Yudy Santos (born 25 October 1994) is a Brazilian judoka.

He won a medal at the 2019 World Judo Championships.

In 2020, he won the silver medal in the men's 81 kg event at the 2020 Pan American Judo Championships held in Guadalajara, Mexico.

He represented Brazil at the 2020 Summer Olympics.

References

External links
 

1994 births
Living people
Brazilian male judoka
Judoka at the 2019 Pan American Games
Pan American Games medalists in judo
Pan American Games gold medalists for Brazil
Medalists at the 2019 Pan American Games
Judoka at the 2020 Summer Olympics
Olympic judoka of Brazil
21st-century Brazilian people
20th-century Brazilian people